Bharati K Jaisingh is an Indian television actress and dancer known for her portrayal of Kiya Gujral in The Buddy Project.

Personal life
Kumar met Kunal Jaisingh on the sets of The Buddy Project. They dated for around five years, and tied the knot on 20 December 2018 in Mumbai.

Career
Kumar made her television debut in 2010 with Disney's Ishaan where she portrayed Twinkle.

In 2012, she play Maloni in Humse Hai Liife. She went on to play Kiya Gujral in Channel V's The Buddy Project.

In 2014, she played Shina in SAB TV's Yam Hain Hum. Kumar then played various roles in anthology series like Pyaar Tune Kya Kiya and Twist Wala Love.

Filmography

Television

Short film

References

Living people
Indian television actresses
1987 births